Daryl Richard Williams (born in Auckland, 30 September 1964) is a New Zealand-born Samoan rugby union player. He plays as a fly-half.

He attended High School at Waitākere College.

Career
A Hurricanes injury replacement player at the end of the 1996 season, loose forward Daryl Williams played the final two matches against the Chiefs and the Waratahs after earlier returning from a playing career in France.

Former Western Samoa lock Williams was a Manawatu player out of Feilding, playing seven matches for Manawatu in 1996.

He was also selected in the New Zealand Maori side, but did not play as he was subsequently found to be ineligible. He was also a New Zealand Colts trialist in 1985.

His first international cap was against Ireland, at Lansdowne Road, on 29 October 1989. Although not being part of the 1991 Rugby World Cup roster, He played in the 1995 Rugby World Cup, playing two matches.

References

External links
Daryl Williams International Statistics
Daryl R. Williams at New Zealand Rugby History

1964 births
Living people
Samoan rugby union players
Rugby union players from Auckland
Samoa international rugby union players
New Zealand sportspeople of Samoan descent
Rugby union locks